Neil Rayner is a British former professional tennis player.

Rayner, a national junior indoor champion from Ilford, made appearances at Wimbledon during the late 1970s and early 1980s. While competing in singles qualifying he had a win over Pakistani Davis Cup player Saeed Meer in 1977. His only Wimbledon main draw came in mixed doubles in 1978, partnering Clare Harrison to a second round exit.

References

External links
 

Year of birth missing (living people)
Living people
British male tennis players
English male tennis players
Tennis people from Essex
People from Ilford